Leedom Estates is a small unincorporated community in Ridley Township, Pennsylvania founded in 1867. It sits alongside Interstate 95 south of Philadelphia in Delaware County.

References

External links
Leedom - Ridley Township History

Unincorporated communities in Delaware County, Pennsylvania
Unincorporated communities in Pennsylvania